Stempfferia elissa, the Elissa epitola, is a butterfly in the family Lycaenidae. It is found in Nigeria and western Cameroon. The habitat consists of forests.

References

Butterflies described in 1898
Poritiinae
Butterflies of Africa
Taxa named by Henley Grose-Smith